Ramappa Balappa Timmapur is a leader of the INC in Karnataka. On 10 June 2016, he was elected to the Karnataka Legislative Council. He secured 33 votes of INC MLAs.

He served as the Cabinet Minister of Sugar, Ports and Inland transport in Government of Karnataka headed by Chief Minister H. D. Kumaraswamy.

He also served as the Minister of Excise from 2016 till 2018.

See also 
TA/DA scam

References

Living people
Members of the Karnataka Legislative Council
Indian National Congress politicians from Karnataka
1964 births